Exaerete frontalis is a species of euglossine bees.

Description

Behavior

Exarete frontalis is a cleptoparasitic species. Females do not build own nests but lay their egg in nests of other large euglossine bees, especially in the genera Eulaema and Eufriesea.

Distribution
Exaerete frontalis is found form Central America, to central South America.

References

4.Dressler, R. L. 1982. Biology of the orchid bees (Euglossini). Annual Review of Ecology and Systematiics 13: 373–394.

front
Hymenoptera of North America
Hymenoptera of South America
Insects of Central America
Taxa named by Félix Édouard Guérin-Méneville
Orchid pollinators
Insects described in 1845